Carex jamesii, known as James's sedge or grass sedge, is a species of sedge native to North America from Minnesota east to New York and south to Oklahoma and South Carolina. It occurs in mesic hardwood forests and produces fruits from early May to mid July. It has two to four perigynia that are subtended by leaf-like pistillate scales. Its seeds are dispersed by ants.

Within the genus Carex, Carex jamesii is in the section Phyllostachyae (sometimes Phyllostachys) and is most closely related to C. juniperorum.

References

External links
Illinois Wildflowers James' sedge
Photos of Carex jamesii, September 2009

jamesii
Flora of North America
Plants described in 1824